Buckville Cemetery is a historic cemetery in rural Garland County, Arkansas.  It is one of the few surviving remnants of the town of Buckville, which was inundated by the creation of Lake Ouachita; the other is the nearby Buckville Baptist Church, which was moved to its present location above the lake's planned water level in 1951.  The cemetery, located near the end of Buckville Road on the north side of the lake (accessible via Arkansas Highway 298), the cemetery has more than 300 burials, include graves of some of the area's earliest settlers.  The oldest documented burial is dated 1861.

The cemetery was listed on the National Register of Historic Places in 2007.

See also
 Buckville, Arkansas
 National Register of Historic Places listings in Garland County, Arkansas

References

External links

 

Cemeteries on the National Register of Historic Places in Arkansas
Cultural infrastructure completed in 1861
1861 establishments in Arkansas
National Register of Historic Places in Garland County, Arkansas
Cemeteries established in the 1860s